Love of the Common People is a 1967 album by American country music artist Waylon Jennings, released on RCA Victor, and the title selection of the album is the selection of the same title.

Background
In his autobiography, Jennings proclaimed his fondness for the title track: "It had it all, the horn stabs that I loved so much, an insistent piano figure that lodged in your brain, and four (count 'em) key modulations upward, so the song never stopped getting you higher.  The lyrics were especially meaningful, for a poor country boy who had worked his way up from 'a dream you could cling to' to a spot in the working world of country music."  In his 2013 book Outlaws: Waylon, Willie, Kris, and the Renegades of Nashville, author Michael Streissguth insists, "After two years of emulating Jim Reeves and Marty Robbins, not to mention the likes of Buck Owens and George Jones, Waylon finally showed signs of asserting his own style on 1967's album Love of the Common People, which boldly featured Mel Tillis' 'Ruby Don't Take Your Love to Town,' a rare commentary on the personal toll of war, and Lennon and McCartney's 'You've Got to Hide Your Love Away.'"  Jennings had also recorded The Beatles' "Norwegian Wood (This Bird Has Flown)" on his previous LP Nashville Rebel.

The reissue of the album (on Buddha/RCA) features two bonus tracks, including the Harlan Howard song "The Chokin' Kind, which rose to #8 for Jennings in 1968.

Reception
Love of the Common People reached #3 on the Billboard country albums chart.  AllMusic:  "There's a certain tendency for country albums of this era to be uneven, and if that's the case on Love of the Common People, it isn't because of bad material but because Jennings is searching the entire time, testing things out, finding that some things work and others don't. It may not be a perfect album, but there are enough remarkable moments to make it nearly essential."

Track listing
"Money Cannot Make the Man" (Jim Glaser) – 2:50
"Young Widow Brown" (Waylon Jennings, Sky Corbin) – 2:09
"You've Got to Hide Your Love Away" (John Lennon, Paul McCartney) – 2:20
"Love of the Common People" (Ronnie Wilkins, John Hurley) – 2:54
"I Tremble for You" (Johnny Cash, Lew DeWitt) – 2:16
"Destiny's Child" (Sonny Curtis) – 2:06
"Ruby, Don't Take Your Love to Town" (Mel Tillis) – 2:13
"The Road" (Ted Harris) – 2:51
"If the Shoe Fits" (Harlan Howard, Freddie Hart) – 2:17
"Don't Waste Your Time" (Marty Taylor) – 2:16
"Taos, New Mexico" (Bob Ferguson) – 2:21
"Two Streaks of Steel" (Ben Peters) – 2:16

Bonus tracks on CD release
"The Chokin' Kind" (Harlan Howard) – 2:27
"Walk On Out of My Mind" (Red Lane) – 2:18

External links
Waylon Jennings' Official Website

Waylon Jennings albums
1967 albums
RCA Victor albums
Albums produced by Chet Atkins